Hyloxalus faciopunctulatus is a species of frog in the family Dendrobatidae. It is endemic to Colombia where it is only known from its type locality, Puerto Nariño in the Amazonas Department, near the Peruvian border. It is likely to be found in Peru and Brazil.

Its natural habitats are tropical moist lowland forests. It is threatened by habitat loss caused by the expansion of agriculture.

References

faciopunctulatus
Amphibians of Colombia
Endemic fauna of Colombia
Taxa named by Juan A. Rivero
Amphibians described in 1991
Taxonomy articles created by Polbot